Frederick Charles Thomas Holden (22 March 1894 – 26 April 1961) was an Australian politician.

He was born in Wallace to George Frederick Holden, a merchant and Minnie Elizabeth Ireson. He attended Geelong College and became a farmer at Melton. In December 1914 he married Elsie Maud Thompson, with whom he had a daughter. He served on Melton Shire Council from 1916 to 1927, and was twice president (1918–19, 1926–27). In 1932 he was elected to the Victorian Legislative Assembly for Grant, representing the United Australia Party. He left the party in 1937 and was an independent until 1940, when he joined the Country Party. He was party whip from 1945 to 1947. Holden was defeated in 1950, and died in Melbourne in 1961.

References

1894 births
1961 deaths
United Australia Party members of the Parliament of Victoria
Independent members of the Parliament of Victoria
National Party of Australia members of the Parliament of Victoria
Members of the Victorian Legislative Assembly
20th-century Australian politicians